Beana is a genus of moths of the family Nolidae. The genus was erected by Francis Walker in 1862.

Species
Beana inconspicua (Bethune-Baker, 1906)(Papua New Guinea)
Beana nitida Tams, 1924 (Thailand)
Beana opala (Pagenstecher, 1900) (Papua New Guinea)
Beana terminigera (Walker, 1858) (India, Myanmar, Malaysia, Borneo, Philippines)
Beana umbrina Hampson, 1918 (Philippines)

References

Nolidae